The women's discus throw at the 1962 European Athletics Championships was held in Belgrade, then Yugoslavia, at JNA Stadium on 15 September 1962.

Medalists

Results

Final
15 September

Qualification
15 September

Participation
According to an unofficial count, 18 athletes from 11 countries participated in the event.

 (1)
 (2)
 (2)
 (2)
 (1)
 (2)
 (2)
 (1)
 (3)
 (1)
 (1)

References

Discus throw
Discus throw at the European Athletics Championships
Euro